The Big "8" Conference is a MHSAA athletic conference in South Central Michigan consisting of Class B and C schools from Branch, Calhoun, Hillsdale, and Jackson counties.

History

Little "C" Conference (1932–73) 
The beginning of the Big "8" Conference can be traced back to its predecessor, the Little "C" Conference, which was founded in 1931 and began play for the 1932–33 school year. The original members of this conference were Athens, Bronson, Homer, Jonesville, Litchfield, Quincy, Reading, and Union City. As the conference was founded during the Great Depression, the league schedule was developed to accommodate a short travel distance for each member school.

The Little "C" was a football only conference for the first two years of its existence. Baseball, basketball, and track and field weren't added until the 1934–35 school year.

The conference saw no change in membership for the first 37 years of its existence. The first change was after the 1968–69 school year when Litchfield, the smallest school in the league, left the Little "C" for the Mid-Southern Conference. The next year, Reading left the Little "C" to join the SCAA.

With only six members in the conference, the majority of the remaining members wanted to add two more teams to the league. However, this was voted down by Athens and Bronson. With expansion denied, the remaining four schools who voted for expansion would terminate the Little "C" Conference to begin a new conference with eight members in 1972. The 1972–73 school year would mark the 41st and final season of the Little "C" Conference. At the time of dissolution, the Little "C" was the longest existing conference with its original membership of schools in Michigan.

Founding and Stability (1973–2021) 
Originally named the Big "8" Interscholastic Association, the conference began competition in the 1973–74 school year with all member schools being similar in make-up, enrollment, and a close proximity to one another. The association established a constitution in which defined the Big "8" as:

The original members of the Big "8" were five of the six remaining Little "C" members Athens (who decided to remain despite voting down expansion), Homer, Jonesville, Quincy, and Union City along with Reading from the SCAA, Concord from the Cascades Conference and Springport from the Central Michigan Athletic Conference. Bronson, who had ambitions of joining the Twin Valley (which they never joined) was not an original member of the Big "8" and decided to become an Independent.

Like its predecessor, the Big "8" sustained an extended period of stability. In its first 44 years of existence, there were no members that left or were added to the conference. However, in 2016, Athens, who was the smallest member of the conference and suffering from declining enrollment, left the Big "8" after the 2016–17 school year to join the SCAA. Bronson, who was the only Little "C" member not to be a charter member of the Big "8", would replace Athens for the 2017–18 school year after spending a couple of years in the Berrien-Cass-St. Joseph League. Coincidentally, both these schools were the ones that voted against expansion of the Little "C".

From its founding in 1973 until 2001, media outlets would sometimes refer to the conference as Big 8 (East) differentiating from the Southwestern Michigan Athletic Conference (SMAC). The SMAC, which was nicknamed the Big 8 would be referred to the media as the Big 8 (West). This would become a moot point after the 2000–01 school year as the SMAC expanded to 16 teams and subsequently be nicknamed the Big 16.

Changes and Future (2021–present) 
With the exception of Bronson replacing Athens for the 2017–18 school year, things were very quiet in the Big "8" prior to 2022 with the exception of Concord switching to 8-man football in 2021 as they joined the Tri-River 8-man Football League but would remain a member of the Big "8" for all other sports.

The summer of 2022 would begin some very major changes in the landscape of the conference. The Cascades Conference was looking to expand from eight to twelve members and would extend invitations to both Homer and Jonesville, who were charter members of both the Little "C" and Big "8". On June 27, Jonesville accepted their invitation to the Cascades Conference beginning in the 2023–24 school year. Three weeks later, on July 18, Homer also accepted the Cascades invitation to join the conference beginning in the 2023–24 school year.

With only six members left in the conference after Homer and Jonesville's departure, the league was looking to expand. On September 15, 2022, the Big "8" announced that Vermontville Maple Valley of the Greater Lansing Athletic Conference would become the seventh member of the Big "8" beginning the 2023–24 school year.

Notes

Member schools

Current members

Notes

Future members

Notes

Former members

Membership Timeline

Conference Sports
The Big "8" Conference currently sponsors 13 sports (7 boys and 6 girls).

References

Michigan high school sports conferences
High school sports conferences and leagues in the United States
1973 establishments in Michigan